The Politics of Ivory Coast takes place in a framework of a presidential representative democratic republic, whereby the President of Ivory Coast is both head of state and head of government, and of a multi-party system. Executive power is exercised by the President and the Government. Legislative power is vested in both the government and parliament.

The capital since 1983 is Yamoussoukro; however, Abidjan remains the commercial center. Most countries maintain their embassies in Abidjan. A civil war was fought in Ivory Coast between 2002–2004 and a second civil war broke out in March 2011 following contested elections that saw president-elect Alassane Ouattara come into power in 2011 and reelected in 2015.
It is located in Africa.

Civil war

Troops, mostly hailing from the north of the country, mutinied in the early hours of 19 September 2002. They soon after launched attacks in many cities, including Abidjan. By lunchtime, they had control of the north of the country. Their principal claim relates to the definition of who is a citizen of Ivory Coast (and so who can stand for election as president), voting rights and their representation in government in Abidjan. The events in Abidjan shows that it is not a tribal issue, but a crisis of transition from a dictatorship to a democracy, with the clashes inherent in the definition of citizenship.
Forces involved in the conflict include:
 Government forces, the National Army (FANCI), also called loyalists, formed and equipped essentially since 2003
 The Young Patriots: nationalist groups aligned with President Laurent Gbagbo
 Mercenaries recruited by President Gbagbo:
 allegedly, Belarusians
 some former combatants of Liberia, including under-17 youths, forming the so-called "Lima militia" 
 New Forces (Forces Nouvelles, FN), ex-northern rebels, who hold 60% of the country; their political expression is the Mouvement patriotique de Côte d'Ivoire, or MPCI
 French forces: troops sent within the framework of Opération Licorne and under UN mandate (United Nations Operation in Côte d'Ivoire), 3000 men in February 2003 and 4600 in November 2004;
 Soldiers of the Economic Community of West African States (ECOWAS), White helmets, also under the UN.

Executive branch

|President
|Alassane Ouattara
|Rally of the Republicans
|4 December 2011
|-
|Vice-President
|Tiémoko Meyliet Koné
|Independent
|19 April 2022
|-
|Prime Minister
|Patrick Achi
|Rally of the Republicans
|8 March 2021
|}

Ivory Coast's 1959 constitution provides for strong presidency within the framework of a separation of powers. The executive is personified in the president, elected for a five-year term. The president is commander in chief of the armed forces, may negotiate and ratify certain treaties, and may submit a bill to a national referendum or to the National Assembly. According to the constitution, the President of the National Assembly assumes the presidency in the event of a vacancy, and he completes the remainder of the deceased president's term. The cabinet is selected by and is responsible to the president. Changes are being proposed to some of these provisions, to extend term of office to 7 years, establish a senate, and make president of the senate interim successor to the president.

Laurent Gbagbo took power following a popular overthrow of the interim leader Gen. Robert Guéï who had claimed a dubious victory in presidential elections; Gen. Guéï himself had assumed power on 25 December 1999, following a military coup against the government of former President Henri Konan Bédié. Gbagbo was elected president in 2000 in an election boycotted by many oppositional forces. The president is elected by popular vote for a five-year term. The prime minister is appointed by the president. Alassane Ouattara is currently the president of Ivory Coast. He was reelected in the 2015 Ivorian presidential election.

After a new constitution was approved by referendum, it is expected President Alassane Ouattara would appoint a Vice-President before 2020.
The President and Vice-President will run on a joint ticket from 2020. They will be both elected for a five-year term, with only one possible reelection. The Vice-President will replace the President in case of death, resignation and any other vacancy.

In November 2020, Alassane Ouattara won third term in office in elections boycotted by the opposition. His opponents argued it was illegal for president Ouattara to run for a third term.

Legislative branch

Parliament of Ivory Coast is a bicameral body composed by the National Assembly and the Senate of Ivory Coast. Prior to November 2016 and the future creation of the Senate, the Parliament of Ivory Coast was only composed of the National Assembly.
The National Assembly (Assemblée Nationale) has 255 members, elected for a five-year term in single-seat constituencies. It passes on legislation typically introduced by the president although it also can introduce legislation.
The Senate of Ivory Coast (Sénat) will have two-thirds of the senators indirectly elected and one-third appointed by the president-elect, elected for a five-year term in single-seat constituencies.
Ivory Coast is a one party dominant state with the Rally of the Republicans in power.

Judicial branch

The judicial system culminates in the Supreme Court of Ivory Coast. The High Court of Justice is competent to try government officials for major offenses. The Supreme Court or Court Supreme consists of four chambers: Judicial Chamber for criminal cases, Audit Chamber for financial cases, Constitutional Chamber for judicial review cases, and Administrative Chamber for civil cases; there is no legal limit to the number of members.

Political parties and elections

Presidential elections

Parliamentary elections

Administrative divisions

For administrative purposes, Ivory Coast is divided into 58 departments, each headed by a prefect appointed by the central government. There are 196 communes, each headed by an elected mayor, plus the city of Abidjan with ten mayors.

The 58 departments (départements, singular - département) are listed in the article Departments of Ivory Coast.

International organization participation
ACP, AfDB, AU, ECA, ECOWAS, Entente, FAO, FZ, G-24, G-77, IAEA, IBRD, ICAO, ICCt (signatory), ICRM, IDA, IDB, IFAD, IFC, IFRCS, ILO, IMF, IMO, Interpol, IOC, IOM, ISO, ITU, ITUC, MONUC, NAM, OIC, OPCW, UN, UNCTAD, UNESCO, UNHCR, UNIDO, UPU, WADB (regional), WAEMU, WCO, WFTU, WHO, WIPO, WMO, WToO, WTrO

References

External links and references
 CIA World Factbook 2003